A Forlorn Throne is the fourth full-length album by Slechtvalk released in May 2010.

Recording
The band went to Sweden's Studio Mega in late 2009 with producer Johan "the ant" Örnborg to record A Forlorn Throne. It was mixed and mastered by Jens Bogren at Fascination Street, and the cover artwork as well as a new logo was designed by Raymond Swanland of Oddworld fame. The album was released on May 31, 2010 in the Netherlands, and July 15 elsewhere. Three of the songs feature guest vocals by Erik Grawsiö of Månegarm.

Track listing
"Tamers of the Seas" – 4:37	
"Forsaken" – 8:32	
"Desolate" – 6:29	
"Divided by Malice" – 7:11	
"Allegiance" – 7:53	
"Enthroned" – 8:32	
"Bewailed" – 5:19	
"Towards the Dawn" – 7:35	
"Vengeance of a Scorned King" – 5:43

Personnel
 Shamgar – vocals, guitars
 Ohtar – guitars, vocals
 Seraph – guitar
 Grimbold – drums, vocals
 Premnath – keyboards
 Erik Grawsiö (Månegarm) – guest vocals

References

Slechtvalk albums
2010 albums